The Battle for the Golden Horseshoe is an annual rivalry college football game played between the UC Davis Aggies and the Cal Poly Mustangs. Although the two teams have met on the gridiron since 1939, the rivalry officially began in name with the 2004 game at Cal Poly. The winner of the game receives the Golden Horseshoe Trophy, which was also created in 2004 for the inaugural game. Due to a misunderstanding, both schools constructed a trophy for the rivalry and brought it to the inaugural game. The teams decided that the rivalry would adopt the trophy created by the winner of that game; UC Davis won 36–33 and was therefore allowed to make its trophy the official one to be exchanged in all subsequent meetings.

UC Davis won the trophy in 2004, 2005, 2009, 2010, 2011, 2014, 2017, 2018, 2019, March 2021, October 2021, and 2022 while Cal Poly took it in 2006, 2007, 2008, 2012, 2013, 2015 and 2016. UC Davis leads the all-time series 26–20–2.

There is also controversy regarding the addition of gems to the trophy after each win. The Mustang Maniacs (today known as the Stang Gang after a student vote), the student group who holds the trophy while it is under Cal Poly's control, added blue and green gems to the trophy from 2006 to 2008. But when the Aggie Pack regained control of the trophy in 2009, they removed the gems, wishing to keep the trophy in its original condition.

Both programs are based in California, and both are primarily members of the non-football sponsoring Big West Conference, while their football teams both play within the Big Sky Conference. Additionally, there are many key differences between the two institutions: UC Davis is located in northern California and is a member of the University of California system, while Cal Poly is located in southern California and is part of the California State University system, giving the rivalry an element of culture clash. This balance of similarities and differences has given the rivalry a basis in respect between both institutions for their academic statures as well as often recruiting the same players. After being hired by Army, former Cal Poly head coach Rich Ellerson compared the spirit of the Mustangs' rivalry with UC Davis to the rivalry between Army and Navy, commenting to the Times Herald-Record: "We had a rivalry at Cal Poly with UC Davis, and I always would try to invoke the kind of rivalry we have with Army-Navy: a rivalry that's founded on respect as opposed to disdain."

Game results

See also  
 List of NCAA college football rivalry games

References

Cal Poly Mustangs football
College football rivalries in the United States
Recurring sporting events established in 2004
UC Davis Aggies football
Big Sky Conference rivalries
1939 establishments in California